François-Auguste Gevaert (31 July 1828 in Huysse, near Oudenaarde – 24 December 1908 in Brussels) was a Belgian musicologist and composer.

Life

His father was a baker, and he was intended for the same profession, but better counsels prevailed and he was permitted to study music. He was sent in 1841 to the Ghent Conservatory, where he studied under Édouard de Sommere and Martin-Joseph Mengal. Then he was appointed organist of the Jesuit church in that city.

Soon Gevaert's compositions attracted attention, and he won the Belgian Prix de Rome which entitled him to two years' travel. The journey was postponed during the production of his first opera and other works. He finally embarked on it in 1849. After a short stay in Paris he went to Spain, and subsequently to Italy.

In 1867 Gevaert, having returned to Paris, became "Chef de Chant" at the Academie de Musique there, in succession to the popular operatic composer Fromental Halévy. Four years later, he was appointed head of the Brussels Conservatoire. In that role, he "exerted a far-reaching influence through his historical concerts, producing works of all nations and periods."

Though during his lifetime Gevaert's own music enjoyed considerable success in Belgium (it included no fewer than a dozen operas, two of which were Quentin Durward and Le Capitaine Henriot), it is now forgotten, save for some of his choral pieces, which have recently been issued on CD by the Fuga Libera label. Nowadays he is mostly remembered, even in his native land, less as a composer than as a teacher, historian, and lecturer. His many prose writings include a  Treatise on Instrumentation (still sometimes used today), a book on harmony, and a Vade Mecum for organists. Notable students of Gevaert included Alfred Wotquenne, who is best known for having provided the first thorough listing of C.P.E. Bach's compositions, whilst Gevaert's daughter Jacqueline Marthe married the singer and art historian Hippolyte Fierens-Gevaert.

Honours 
 1881: Grand Officier in the Order of Leopold.
 1896: Grand Cordon in the Order of Leopold.

Selected works 
 Te Deum (1843)
 Ouverture Flandre au lion (1848)
 Fantasia sobre motivos españoles (1850)
 Requiem (1853)
 Vers l'avenir (1905)
 Grand' Messe de Noël Puer Natus est Nobis (1907)
 Quartet for clarinet, horn, bassoon and piano

Operas
Georgette, ou le moulin de Fontenoy (1853)
 Le billet de Marguerite (1854)
 Les lavandières de Santarem (1855)
 Quentin Durward (1858, libretto by Michel Carré and Eugène Cormon after Walter Scott
 Le diable au moulin (1859)
 La Château Trompette (1860)
 Le Capitaine Henriot (1864)

Secular Cantatas
 België (1847)
 Le roi Léar (1847)
 Évocation patriotique (1856)
 De nationale verjaerdag (1857)
 Le retour de l'armée (1859)
 Jacob van Artevelde (1864)

References

External links

 
 
 
 
 

1828 births
1908 deaths
19th-century classical composers
20th-century classical composers
Belgian classical composers
Belgian male classical composers
Romantic composers
Belgian opera composers
Male opera composers
Belgian music educators
Prix de Rome (Belgium) winners
People from Oudenaarde
Recipients of the Pour le Mérite (civil class)
20th-century Belgian male musicians
19th-century Belgian male musicians